Proteuxoa florescens is a moth of the family Noctuidae. It is found in the Australian Capital Territory, New South Wales, South Australia, Tasmania, Victoria and Western Australia.

The wingspan is about 40 mm. Adults have light and dark brown patterned forewings, each with a dark comma mark and pale brown hindwings.

External links
Australian Faunal Directory
Australian Insects
Image at Flickr
Image

Proteuxoa
Moths of Australia
Moths described in 1857